Émile Jules Grillot called  Émile-Jules Grillot de Givry (or Émile-Angelo Grillot de Givry) (5 August 1874 in Paris – 16 February 1929 in Paris) was a French Catholic man of letters and occultist, Freemason and pacifist, translator into French of numerous alchemical works including those of Paracelsus.

Biography
Son of Claude Grillot and Marie Louise Adenot he studied in Paris with the Jesuits of the Rue de Vaugirard. He studied music and oriental languages before becoming interested in Christian hermeticism. Working as a music teacher, he married Virginie Doco on 2 September 1905. He also made a living teaching French and, between 1910 and 1920, as an organist in a Parisian church.

He came into contact with Parisian occult circles, with figures such as Stanislas de Guaita, Gérard Encausse and Péladan, soon becoming, although young, one of the most famous and respected Hermetic scholars.

Works
It would be on reading "Là-bas" by Joris-Karl Huysmans that Émile-Jules Grillot de Givry became passionate about the occult: Huysmans considered him to be "the greatest expert in Christian symbolism".

His taste for aesthetics, as well as his Catholicism, led him, at a very young age, to enter the circle of Péladan's closest collaborators, in the Ordre de la Rose-Croix Catholique et Esthetique du Temple et du Graal (Order of the Catholic and Aesthetic Rosicrucian of the Temple and the Grail) which at that time acquired considerable fame with his Salons. At the same time, he was initiated into the Rite of Memphis-Misraim of which his friend Dr Gérard Encausse (Papus) had become a grandmaster.

In 1895–1896, he was part of the editorial board of the magazine La renaissance idéaliste (The idealistic renaissance) edited by René Albert Fleury and the Comte Léonce de Larmandie. In this magazine he began to develop pacifist themes which he supported throughout his life and which he explained in his book, Le Christ et la Patrie.

In Masonic lodges, he met  for whom he made, between 1888 and 1890, several translations of the Bibliothèque Rosicrucienne of Henri Chacornac, father of Paul Chacornac, Parisian publishers owners of the Éditions Traditionnelles.

Parallel to his work at the Rosicrucian Library, he began his translations: the Traité de la pierre philosophale (Treatise on the Philosopher's Stone) attributed to Saint Thomas Aquinas, the Adumbratio kabbalae christianae of Franciscus Mercurius van Helmont followed by the translation of the famous Amphitheatrum sapientiae aeternae of Khunrath

He then translated Absconditorum clavis of Guillaume Postel then the Savonarola's Treatise of the Seven Degrees of Perfection and, a few months later, the Basilian Aphorisms. In the following years, he published the translation of Paracelsus' Traité des trois essences premières (Chacornac, Paris 1903), which was the beginning of the two volumes of the translation of Paracelsus' Complete Works.

In 1911, he published Le Christ et la Patrie. A documented study on the theoretical and theological incompatibility between Christianity and militarism. Initially ignored, the text was suddenly popular after the First World War. In 1924, a second edition was published and the book became one of the cornerstones of French anti-militarist literature.

In 1925 and 1926, he translated into French both the Monas Hieroglyphica of John Dee and The Kabbalah of Jacques Casanova of Bernhard Marr.

He collaborated with the magazine Le Voile d'Isis, became a friend of Léon Bloy and René Guénon and translated old lost texts from the Corpus Hermeticum: Nicolas Flamel, Basil Valentine, Dom Pernety.

The Masonic precepts or Masonic code have been wrongly attributed to him insofar as they can be read in the Journal historique et littéraire (Historical and Literary Journal) of 1839

Bibliography
 .
 
 
 
 
 His latest book:  Translated by J. Courtenay Locke:

References

1874 births
1929 deaths
French alchemists
French Freemasons
French occultists
French occult writers